Mallett Antiques is an antiques dealer with galleries in London and New York who regularly exhibit at the International Fine Art & Antique Fairs.

Founded in 1865m, Mallett & Son Antiques is one of England's oldest dealers of fine antiquities. They specialize in English and Continental furniture and decor. In 2017 Mallett was officially out of business as stated by its last owner, Stanley Gibbons Ltd.

History 

The company was founded in 1865 by John Mallett (a jeweller and Silversmith) at 36 Milsom Street, Bath, Somerset, England. His son, Walter Mallett, who had joined his father's business in the 1870s or early '80s, quickly assumed complete control, and today he is acknowledged by Mallett as the real founder of the firm. It was he who expanded the stock to include old silver and furniture and who arranged for the purchase of the lease of the Octagon Chapel. This building had originally, in 1767, been designed as a church by the architect Thomas Lightholder, whose specific brief was to produce a structure which would be warm, comfortable and well lit. The Octagon fulfilled all of these requirements, and it became quite the most fashionable church in Bath. Eminent and distinguished visitors made a point of engaging a pew for as long as they stayed in the city, hiring it at the same time as they hired their lodgings. The most expensive of these were like small rooms, each with its own fireplace and easy chairs. Between service and sermon, an interval was allowed during which footmen poked the fires and saw that their master and mistress were comfortable. The vault of this building were let out to a wine merchant, which gave rise to the verses by Christopher Anstey: 
Spirits above and spirits below, 
Spirits of Bliss and spirits of woe, 
The spirits above are spirits Divine,
The spirits below are spirirts of wine. 

Since the building was leasehold, it was never consecrated, so when it fell into disuse in the 1890s Mallett's take it over. New Showrooms were built on each side of the church, with workshops and storage in the basement. A gas engine was installed to drive the polishing lathes, work the lift, make the electric light and, by means of a fan, circulate air through every part of the building. With the improvement in communications, express trains serviced the West Country to and from London and facilitated attendance at the spa, bringing much added interest and business to Mallett's at the Octagon.

In 1908 the Franco-British Exhibition (1908)  was held at Earls Court in London, and the firm took a stand there. This was such a successful venture that Walter Mallett decided to open a permanent shop in London, and he took a lease of premises at 40 New Bond Street, which contained showrooms on two floors displaying stock of furniture including mirrors, pictures and objects, each room arranged to re-create the atmosphere of a private house.

On his death in 1930, the business passed to a consortium of six of his employees, who in 1937 decided to close the Octagon premises and move the whole business to London. Francis Mallett became chairman. On his death he left a large part of his collection to the Ashmolean museum at Oxford. After the Second World War, under the new chairmanship of Francis Egerton, Mallett's began to assume its present form.

Mallett's have an association with museums and private collections all over the world including the Victoria and Albert Museum.

In 1983 Francis Egerton retired and in 1987, under the new management, Mallett became a public company. Lanto Synge assumed the role of Chief Executive until 2009 when he retired. Lanto Synge has had a number of books published on antiques and on antique needlework, a particular specialty of his, including 'Art of Embroidery — A history of Style and Technique', produced in conjunction with the Royal School of Needlework. In 1999 he published 'Mallett Millennium', which is illustrated throughout with photographs from the extensive Mallett archives.

In 1991, the Bond Street business moved to new enlarged premises at 141 New Bond Street with twelve showrooms.

In 2012 Mallett moved its premises to Ely House, 37 Dover Street. This classical townhouse, built as the London palace for the Bishop of Ely, remains in the centre of London's art market. It is, like Mallett's first gallery in Bath, a famous architectural masterpiece and a Grade I listed building, designed by the renowned neo-classical architect Robert Taylor in 1772 for Robert Keene, the Bishop of Ely. From 1894 until recently it was occupied by the Albemarle Club whose members included artists and authors such as Oscar Wilde.

Mallett at Bourdon House 1962 – 2007 

Mallett's second business was established in 1962 at Bourdon House, in Mayfair, until 1953 the London House of the late 2nd Duke of Westminster. Built for William Burdon Esq in the years 1723–25, during the reign of George I, the house stood amidst fields and market gardens between the then emerging Berkeley and Hanover Squares. Mallett sold Bourdon House in 2007.

Mallett Inc, New York 

Since 2003 Mallett has also been operating from a New York Gallery at 929 Madison Avenue and East 74th Street. Mallett completely renovated the New York Brownstone building and now offers stock from the London showrooms.

Furniture makers exhibited at Mallett 

Robert Adam,
Matthew Boulton,
George Bullock,
Sir William Chambers,
John Cheere,
Thomas Chippendale,
John Cobb,
Gérard Dagly,
Gillow,
Christopher Fuhrlohg,
Benjamin Goodison,
John Gumley,
Giles Grendey,
William Hallett,
Gawen Hamilton,
George Hepplewhite,
Henry Holland,
Thomas Hope,
Ince and Mayhew,
Georges Jacob,
Jackson and Graham,
Thomas Johnson,
Owen Jones,
William Kent,
Paul de Lamerie,
Pierre Langlois,
John Linnell,
Matthias Lock,
John Makepeace,
John McLean,
Daniel Marot,
Meissen,
Bernard Molitor,
James Moore,
William Morris,
F & C Osler,
Robert Osmond,
Daniel Quare,
John Ravenscroft,
Jean Henri Riesener,
David Roentgen,
John Singer Sargent,
George Seddon,
Sèvres,
Thomas Sheraton,
George Smith,
Sir John Soane,
Paul Storr,
James 'Athenian' Stuart,
Thomas Tompion,
John Vardy,
William Vile,
Josiah Wedgwood,
Thomas Weeks.

Since 2006, Mallett has quickly expanded and established three new and distinct companies, James Harvey British Art, Meta and Hatfields Restoration.

James Harvey British Art 

Now operates from 15 Langton Street, Chelsea, SW10. The gallery is dedicated to promoting British Artists from the 17th century to the present day. With an emphasis on the less established names of the eighteenth and nineteenth centuries, the gallery will also promote traditional figurative contemporary art.

Meta 

Meta has commissioned designers, including Asymptote Architecture, Hani Rashid and Lise Anne Couture, Edward Barber & Jay Osgerby, Tord Boontje, Matali Crasset and Wales & Wales to create contemporary objects and furniture.

Hatfields Restoration 

In 2007 Mallett merged with Hatfields and took over premises in London on Clapham High Street. Scholars House is a late 18th century building from which the company is developing a range of restoration services. Hatfields has a history which dates back to 1834 when the original Hatfield family established the firm. Initially founded to produce miniature frames, the company expanded to include furniture workshops, restoring and conserving furniture and works of art for Royalty, private and museum collections throughout the world. In the 1930s the company noted on its letterhead that it had warrants from Queen Victoria, The Prince of Wales & King Edward VII.

References

Further reading 
 Synge L Great English Furniture

Reference and press 
Meta at Design Miami
 http://www.iconeye.com/index.php?option=com_content&view=article&id=3582:meta-at-design-miami

The Art Newspaper
 http://www.theartnewspaper.com/articles/Mallett%20to%20offer%20contemporary%20design/8615

Telling Tales Exhibition at the Victoria & Albert Museum 2009
 http://www.vam.ac.uk/microsites/telling-tales/

V & A Magazine Magic Wardrobes and Scary Chairs, Gareth Williams, Summer 2009
 

https://englishantiques.medium.com/the-death-of-mallett-67200e897fae

Antiques
Companies based in Bath, Somerset
British Royal Warrant holders
English furniture
1865 establishments in England
Retail companies established in 1865